Drepanojana is a monotypic moth genus in the family Eupterotidae. Its single species, Drepanojana fasciata, is found in Ghana, Nigeria and Sierra Leone. Both the genus and species were described by Per Olof Christopher Aurivillius in 1893.

The wingspan is about 40 mm. Both wings are uniform dark umber brown. The forewings, at the costa near the apex in the areas seven and eight, with a creamy spot and with a similar small submarginal dot in the sixth area.

Former species
 Drepanojana citheronia Bryk, 1944 is now Eupterote citheronia (Bryk, 1944).

References

Janinae
Moths described in 1893
Monotypic moth genera